The Screen Actors Guild Award for Outstanding Performance by a Female Actor in a Comedy Series is an award given by the Screen Actors Guild to honor the finest female acting achievement in a comedy series. Actresses are eligible for the award whether they appear in leading or supporting roles in their respective programs.

Winners and nominees

1990s

2000s

2010s

2020s

Superlatives

Trivia

Multiple winners
 5 wins
 Julia Louis-Dreyfus

 4 wins
 Tina Fey

 3 wins
 Megan Mullally

 2 wins
 Uzo Aduba
 Betty White
 Jean Smart

Multiple nominees

 12 nominations
 Julia Louis-Dreyfus

 7 nominations
 Edie Falco
 Tina Fey
 Megan Mullally

 6 nominations
 Christina Applegate

 5 nominations
 Patricia Heaton

 4 nominations
 Uzo Aduba
 Calista Flockhart
 Helen Hunt
 Lisa Kudrow
 Mary-Louise Parker
 Sarah Jessica Parker

 3 nominations
 Candice Bergen
 Julie Bowen
 Rachel Brosnahan
 Ellen DeGeneres
 America Ferrera
 Jane Fonda
 Amy Poehler
 Lily Tomlin
 Tracey Ullman
 Sofía Vergara
 Betty White

 2 nominations
 Jennifer Aniston
 Christine Baranski
 Alex Borstein
 Alison Brie
 Kim Cattrall
 Felicity Huffman
 Jane Kaczmarek
 Ellie Kemper
 Debra Messing
 Catherine O'Hara
 Doris Roberts
 Jean Smart

See also
 Primetime Emmy Award for Outstanding Lead Actress in a Comedy Series
 Primetime Emmy Award for Outstanding Supporting Actress in a Comedy Series
 Golden Globe Award for Best Actress – Television Series Musical or Comedy

External links 
 SAG Awards official site

Female Actor Comedy Series
 
Television awards for Best Actress